Abu Ja'far Ahmad ibn Yusuf ibn Hud, known by the regnal name al-Musta'in Billah, was the fourth member of the Banu Hud family to rule the Taifa of Zaragoza. He ruled from 1085 to 1110. He was the son of Yusuf al-Mu'taman ibn Hud.

References
 List of Muslim rulers

Emirs of Zaragoza
11th-century rulers in Al-Andalus
12th-century rulers in Europe
Banu Hud
11th-century Arabs